Kiss Them All! is a 2013 Russian film directed by Zhora Kryzhovnikov and produced by Timur Bekmambetov, Ilya Burets, Dmitry Nelidov, Sergey Svetlakov. The movie is a wedding comedy. Natasha and Roma — these two characters are the protagonists of the film who are progressive and talented and dream to organize their wedding by the sea, while Natasha's step-father Boris Ivanovich wants classic Russian wedding in the restaurant.

Plot 
Natasha and Roma are progressive and talented young people who dream to organize their wedding by the sea in Europe. But Natasha's step-father thinks differently and drafts his own plan. Being the city manager he feels such an event should be a springboard for his own career.

Cast 
 Yuliya Aleksandrova
 Anastasia Dobakhova
 Egor Koreshkov
 Yevgeniy Kushpel
 Sergey Lavygin
 Valentina Mazunina
 Aleksandr Pal
 Fedor Starykh
 Yuliya Sules
 Sergey Svetlakov
 Vladimir Tebenko
 Yan Tsapnik
 Yelena Valyushkina
 Danila Yakushev

Reception 
Kiss them All  is the most profitable domestic film in the history of Russian box office, having managed to earn more than 27.3 million dollars on a budget of 1.5 million $.

The film received mainly positive reviews and reception from critics. Russia Beyond the Headlines wrote in the review— "Russian viewers were offended but laughed, and critics loved it." However, it got a huge negative backlash from viewers. Peak of negativity was after popular Russian YouTube blogger BadComedian made a negative review of this film.

Sequel
The film was followed by Kiss Them All! 2, which became the most profitable film of 2014 in Russia.

Remake
A Mexican remake of the film was released in 2018 and was named «Hasta que la boda nos separe» («Until the wedding breaks us apart»). In Russia it's known as «Kiss Them All in Mexico».

References

External links

Films about weddings
2013 comedy films
2013 films
Russian comedy films
2013 directorial debut films